The main Latin tenses can be divided into two groups: the present system (also known as  tenses), consisting of the present, future, and imperfect; and the perfect system (also known as  tenses), consisting of the perfect, future perfect, and pluperfect. 

To these six main tenses can be added various periphrastic or compound tenses, such as  'I am going to lead', or  'I have led'. However, these are less commonly used than the six basic tenses.

In addition to these six tenses of the indicative mood, there are four tenses in the subjunctive mood and two in the imperative mood. Participles in Latin have three tenses (present, perfect, and future). The infinitive has two main tenses (present and perfect) as well as a number of periphrastic tenses used in reported speech.

Latin tenses do not have exact English equivalents, so that often the same tense can be translated in different ways depending on its context: for example,  can be translated as 'I lead', 'I am leading' or 'I led', and  can be translated as 'I led' and 'I have led'. In some cases Latin makes a distinction which is not made in English: for example, imperfect  and perfect  both mean 'I was' in English, but they differ in Latin.

The Latin tense system

The main Latin tenses can be put in a table as follows:

Substituting the verb  'I lead' gives the following tenses:

To these must be added three participles, present, future, and perfect, a gerundive, and two imperative tenses, present and future.

In the above verb, the future indicative and present subjunctive are the same in the 1st person singular, but differ in the other persons.

Passive verbs are constructed as follows. The perfect tenses are made using the perfect participle of the verb together with part of the verb  'I am'. There are two forms of the  tenses.

Deponent verbs, such as  'I speak, I spoke', are constructed in the same way as the above. 

The difference between the two sets of perfect tenses is sometimes one of time, the second set referring to an earlier time than the first, as in this example from Caesar:

'the bridge, which earlier on had been broken by a storm, had now almost been rebuilt'

Another set of tenses can be formed periphrastically with the future participle, as follows:

An example of the perfect subjunctive of this set is the following from the historian Livy:

'tell us, Appius Claudius, what exactly you would have done, if you had been censor at that time?'

The verb  has a future infinitive  (equivalent to ), allowing the possibility of an imperfect subjunctive with future reference , and another pluperfect subjunctive . The following example is from Livy:

'and the city would have been besieged, if the consul Horatius had not been recalled'

A similar set of tenses can be constructed using the gerundive:  'I am needing to be led', which in later Latin often had a temporal meaning, as in this example from the 4th-century historian Eutropius:

'when Hannibal was about to be handed over to the Romans, he drank poison'

Further tenses can be made with :  'I have led'. These, rare at first, gradually became the regular way of forming the perfect tense in some Romance languages:

'Pompeius had placed a camp in the mountains within sight of both towns'

'the rest of the group should bring their weapons with me, where I shall order.'

Present indicative
Formation

The present tense of regular verbs is formed in different ways according to the conjugation of the verb.
1st conjugation: 
2nd conjugation: 
3rd conjugation (-ō): 
3rd conjugation (-iō): 
4th conjugation: 

Irregular verbs:
'I give': 
'I bear': 
'I go': 
'I want': 
'I am': 
'I am able': 

Passive and deponent verbs:
1st conjugation: 
2nd conjugation: 
3rd conjugation (-ō): 
3rd conjugation (-iō): 
4th conjugation: 

Present meaning

There is no distinction of aspect in the present tense:  can mean 'I do (now)', 'I do (regularly), or 'I am doing'; that is, it can be perfective, habitual, or progressive in aspect.

Current situation

The present tense can refer to a current situation:
 (Cicero)
'the Senate understands this; the Consul sees it; yet this man is still alive'

 (Cicero)
'perhaps you are telling the truth'

 (Plautus)
'where is my son living currently?'

 (Plautus)
'where are you coming from? what are you carrying? what are you hurrying for?'

Habitual meaning

The present tense can also be used for habitual actions:

 (Cicero)
'I suffer these things every day'

General truths

The present, as in English, can also describe a general truth:
 (Catullus)
'suns can set and return again'

Perfective present

It can also be used performatively to describe an event which takes place at the moment of speaking or immediately after it:
 (Cicero)
'I come (I'll come) now to the testimony of the Dorylensians'

Perfect continuous meaning

The present can sometimes mean 'has been doing', referring to a situation that started in the past and is still continuing. In some sentences a length of time is given and the adverb  'now' is added:

 (Cicero)
'he has been living in Lilybaeum for many years now'

 (Plautus)
'no one has been living here for six months now'

 (Cicero)
'he has been a Roman citizen for a long time now'

The present tense can also be used in this meaning when combined with a temporal clause using :
 (Terence)
'I've been trembling and shivering ever since I caught sight of her'

Sometimes the  clause itself has the present tense:

 (Martial)
'ever since he has been (lit. 'is') mine, he has never harmed me with a mistress'

 (Cicero)
'I've been feeling completely out of touch ever since I've been in Formiae'

Another idiom is the following using the conjunction :
multī annī sunt cum in aere meō est (Cicero)
'he has owed me money for many years now' (lit. 'there are many years that he is in my bronze')

Historic present

The present tense is often used in narrative in a historic sense, referring to a past event, especially when the writer is describing an exciting moment in the story. This is known as the 'historic present':
 (Caesar)
'he sees the enemy threatening ... he immediately seizes weapons from those next to him ...'

According to Pinkster, the historic present is the most frequent tense used in narrative in both prose and poetry. 

In Caesar when a verb is placed initially in the sentence, as in the first example above, it is very frequently in the present tense.

Another situation where the use of the historic present is frequent is in utterance verbs, such as  'they give a pledge' or  'they beg'. More than half the historic presents in Caesar are of this kind.

In biographical writing, however, the perfect is used much more often than the present.

Historic present with imperfect meaning

The present tense can replace not only the perfect tense, but also the imperfect tense:
 (Caesar)
'in the whole camp there is panic' (i.e. people were panicking)

After 

After  'while', the present indicative also has the meaning of an imperfect tense:
 (Ovid)
'while she was fleeing, her cloak slipped from her back and she left it behind'

Potential meaning

Another idiom that can be mentioned is the phrase , which means 'it would take a long time' or 'it would be tedious'. It is frequently used by Cicero as well as other writers:
 (Nepos)
'it would be tedious to recount all the battles'

Future indicative
Formation

The future indicative tense of regular verbs ends in either -bō or -bor or in -am or -ar.
1st conjugation: 
2nd conjugation: 
3rd conjugation (-ō):  
3rd conjugation (-iō): 
4th conjugation: 

Irregular verbs:
'I give': 
'I bear': 
'I go': 
'I want': 
'I am': 
'I am able': 

Passive and deponent verbs:
1st conjugation: 
2nd conjugation: 
3rd conjugation (-ō): 
3rd conjugation (-iō): 
4th conjugation: 

A future meaning can also be expressed using a periphrastic future such as  'I am going to lead' (see below).

Usage

There is no distinction in the future between perfective and imperfective aspect, so that  can mean either 'I will lead' or 'I will be leading'.

Future event or situation

The future tense can describe an event or a situation in the near or distant future:
 (Vitruvius)
'I will explain this in the next book'

 (Cicero)
'when I get there, I shall be expecting your letters every day'

In subordinate clauses

A difference between Latin and English is that in subordinate clauses such as 'if this happens in future', English uses the present tense, but Latin usually uses the future. 

 (Cicero)
'I will tell you when I have some news' (lit. 'I will have')

 (Cato)
'if (at some future time) you eat it (i.e. cabbage) raw, dip it in vinegar'

 (Cicero)
'through him we shall easily get what we want' (lit. 'what we will want')

Occasionally, however, a present tense can be used in the subordinate clause:

 (Sallust)
'if we win, everything will be safe for us'

Polite requests

The future can also be used for polite requests, as when Cicero sends greetings to his friend Atticus's wife and daughter:
 (Cicero)
'please give my greetings to Pilia and Attica'

Imperfect indicative
Formation

1st conjugation: 
2nd conjugation: 
3rd conjugation (-ō): 
3rd conjugation (-iō): 
4th conjugation: 

Irregular verbs:
'I give': 
'I bear': 
'I go': 
'I want': 
'I am': 
'I am able': 

Passive and deponent verbs:
1st conjugation: 
2nd conjugation: 
3rd conjugation (-ō): 
3rd conjugation (-iō): 
4th conjugation: 

Usage

The imperfect indicative generally has an imperfective meaning and describes situations in the past. Often the imperfect can be translated into English as 'was doing', but sometimes the simple tense 'did' or expressions such as 'used to do', 'would do', 'kept doing', 'began to do', 'had been doing' are more appropriate.

Situation at a particular time

A common use of the imperfect is to describe a situation that already existed at a particular moment:

 (Livy)
'with a stick, which he was carrying in his hand, he drew a circle round the king'

 (Cicero)
'when I got there, the governor was taking a nap'

 (Petronius)
'but when I got home, my soldier was lying in bed'

 (Cicero)
'(Verres) came into the forum; his eyes were burning (with anger)'

Often an expression such as  'then' or  'at that time' is added:

 (Livy)
'at that time (the time of his death) by chance Mettius was fighting on horseback'

 (Livy)
'by this time it was already winter'

 (Livy)
'Carthaginians were living on the island at that time'

Vivid description

The use of the imperfect rather than the perfect can be used to make a scene more vivid, as with this sentence of Cicero's:

 (Cicero)
'a Roman citizen was being flogged with rods in the middle of the forum of Messana, judges'

The passage is commented on by Aulus Gellius. He says that the use of  rather than  creates a 'drawn-out vivid description'; that is to say, making it seem to the audience that the scene is taking place in front of them.

So frequently in descriptions of battles, the imperfect is used to describe what was happening at a particular moment, as though seen through the eyes of an observer:

 (Caesar)
'at the same time the cavalrymen ... as they were returning to the camp, began running into the enemy who were coming towards them and once again began fleeing in another direction'

'Began doing'

Another meaning is inceptive, describing a situation that began at a certain moment and continued indefinitely. Often in English it is translated with 'began':
 (Livy)
'after the rout began, some began rushing blindly into the water, others, while they were hesitating on the banks, were crushed'

 (Sallust)
'when he heard that some important people had come, he began to agitated with alarm'

 (Caesar)
'after Caesar arrived in Asia, he began hearing reports that Titus Ampius had been trying to steal money from the temple of Diana in Ephesus'

Habitual use

The imperfect tense can describe a situation that used to take place regularly or habitually:

 (Cicero)
'I used to listen to him a lot'

But in sentences like the following, in which the verb has a quasi-negative meaning ('he didn't write as well as he spoke'), the perfect can be used:

 (Cicero)
'Hortensius used to speak better than he wrote'

Iterative use

Similar to the above is the iterative or 'frequentative' use of the imperfect, describing what something that kept on happening or which happened on an indefinite number of occasions:

 ([Caesar])
'Pharnaces sent several embassies to Domitius ... (each time) Domitius would reply ...'

Geographical description

Sometimes the imperfect is used for description of the surroundings as they appeared at the time of the story:
 (Caesar)
'a very high mountain hung over (the road)'

Unfinished action

Another use is to describe an action that someone was intending to do, or about to do, but which never actually took place, or which was interrupted by another event:
 (Tacitus)
'he was on the point of leaving the Senate house'

 (Tacitus)
'he would have rushed into the embrace of his daughter, who was running towards him, if the bodyguards hadn't intervened and stood in the way of both of them'

 (Tacitus)
'after the soldiers of the 14th legion descended from the Alps, all the more rebellious men were for carrying the standards to Vienne; but they were checked by the consensus of the better men and the legion was transported across to Britain'

Pluperfect continuous meaning

When the imperfect tense is used with a length of time it means 'had done' or 'had been doing', referring to a situation which had been going on for some time and was still going on. The adverb  'by now' is sometimes added:

 (Livy)
'which they had been desiring for a long time now'

 (Nepos)
'(the Carthaginians) had been in possession of Sicily for several years by this time'

 (Nepos)
'(at that time) he had been living in Athens for several years'

 (Livy) 
'Philip was nowhere in sight, and for several hours no messenger had arrived from him'

 (Ovid)
'he was living alone without a wife and for a long time he had lacked any partner in his bedroom'

Epistolary imperfect

Sometimes in letters a writer imagines himself in the position of the recipient and uses an imperfect tense to describe a situation which for the writer himself is present:

 (Cicero)
'as a matter of fact I am writing (lit. 'I was writing') this to you while sitting there '

 (Cicero)
'I think (lit. 'was thinking') I will be in my province by the 1st Sextilis (= August)'

 (Cicero)
'Brutus is expecting (lit. 'was expecting') a letter from you at the moment'

Other tenses can also be used from the point of view of the reader, such as the pluperfect and the perfect in the example below:

 (Cicero)
'there was still no news of your coming to Italy when I sent Sextus Villius with this letter for you'

Potential meaning ('would be')

 (Quintilian)
'teaching would be completely superfluous, if nature was sufficient'

 (Pliny)
'it would be very much in your interest, those of you who are fathers, if your sons could study here rather (than in another town)'

Perfect indicative
Formation

The perfect indicative active tense is the third principal part given in Latin dictionaries. In most verbs it uses a different stem from the present tense; for example, the perfect tense of  'I lead' is  'I led'. 

1st conjugation: 
2nd conjugation: 
3rd conjugation (-ō): 
3rd conjugation (-iō): 
4th conjugation: 

The ending  is common in some authors, such as Livy, and in poetry. The form  is sometimes found in poetry.

In the 1st conjugation, the 2nd sg, 2nd pl, and 3rd pl are often contracted, for example .

Irregular verbs:
'I give': 
'I bear': 
'I go':  (rarely )
'I want': 
'I am': 
'I am able': 

Passive and deponent verbs

1st conjugation:  (rarely )
2nd conjugation: 
3rd conjugation (-ō): 
3rd conjugation (-iō): 
4th conjugation: 

These forms are discussed in a separate section below.

The participle changes in gender and number to agree with the subject; for example, it can be plural or feminine:

 (Caesar)
'they did what they were ordered to do'

 (Caesar)
'there were two daughters; of these one was killed, the other captured'

The auxiliary verb with these tenses is usually placed after the participle, but sometimes precedes. This often happens when the auxiliary follows a focussed word, a quantity word, or a conjunction:

 (Caesar)
'Domitius, while fleeing from the camp into the mountains, was killed by cavalrymen'

 (Livy)
'from there Quinctius set out for Corinth'

This style is often found in the historian Livy:

 (Livy)
'Titus and Arruns set out; Lucius Iunius Brutus was added to them as a travelling companion'

Thus in the examples below, the participle does not refer to any event but is merely descriptive or adjectival:

 (Caesar)
'Gaul, taken as a whole, is (i.e., can be described as) divided into three parts'

 (Seneca the Elder)
'he was prepared (i.e. willing) to pay a ransom'

Usage

Past event

The perfect most frequently narrates an event in the past. The usual translation is the simple English past tense with '-ed' or the equivalent:
 (Caesar)
'I came, I saw, I conquered'

 (Servius to Cicero)
'there I met Marcus Marcellus, and I spent that day there'

 (Caesar)
'all at the same time, they leapt down out of the ship'

The perfect passive and deponent can also be used to describe an event in the past:

 (Cicero)
'he died in the year before I became censor'

 (Cicero)
'where was Sextus Roscius murdered? – in Rome'

Present perfect meaning

The perfect active can also be used like the English present perfect ('I have done'):
 (Cicero)
'I have left a horse and a mule for you at Brundisium'

 (Cicero)
'the epidemic has now gone away'

 (Cicero)
'I've written about these matters to the Senate'

 (Plautus)
'I have completed the task which I was given; now I'm hurrying home'

 (Plautus)
'this is the way things are ... I have lost hope'

The perfect passive and perfect deponent can be used like an English perfect tense, describing a present state resulting from an earlier event:

 (Catullus)
'my girlfriend's pet sparrow is dead / has died'

The negative of the perfect often has the meaning 'has not yet done':

 (Cicero)
'I haven't yet quite made my mind up'

 (Cicero)
'he was due to pay the money on the 1st January, but he still hasn't paid it'

 (Cicero)
'since the decree of the Senate hasn't yet been published in writing, I will explain it to you from memory'

Experiential meaning

As with the English perfect, the Latin perfect can sometimes be used to relate experiences which have happened several times in the past:

 (Cicero)
'I have often seen public meetings shout out loud when the words fell aptly (i.e. with a striking rhythm)'

 (Cicero)
'as I've often told you, I am very fond of Appius'

 (Cicero)
'you have always loved me'

 (Cicero)
'he lives with me, and has always done so'

Gnomic perfect

Similar to this is the 'gnomic perfect', which states a general truth based on past experience:

 (Horace)
'a heap of bronze and gold has never taken away fevers from the body' (i.e. doesn't take away)

 (Juvenal)
'no one has ever become totally shameless suddenly'

No longer existing situation

The perfect can sometimes be used to describe a situation which no longer exists:

 (Livy)
'the city of Croton had (used to have) a wall extending for 12 miles in circuit, before Pyrrhus's arrival in Italy'

In a temporal or relative clause

After the conjunction , the perfect indicative often has in iterative meaning (= "whenever"). In English the present tense is often used:

 (Cicero)
'while I am reading, I agree, but as soon as I have put the book down all that agreement slips away'

 (Cicero)
'whenever I come here, this very "doing nothing" delights me'

The perfect tense is also used in temporal clauses after  'after',  'when',  'as soon as', and  'as soon as'. Here English often uses the pluperfect tense:

 (Sallust)
'after he (had) said this, he ordered the signal to be sounded'

It is also used in a past-time relative clause referring to an anterior action where similarly English might use a pluperfect:

 (Cicero)
'he lost the army which he had received'

Length of time

The perfect, not the imperfect, is used when a situation is said to have lasted in the past for a certain length of time, but is now over. (The imperfect, however, with a length of time, is used for a situation which was still going on at the time referred to; see the examples above.)

 (Cicero)
'he lived for ninety years'

 (Seneca)
'Cassius drank water throughout his whole life'

 (Livy)
'but the peace with Alba did not last long'

 (Cicero)
'all the Consuls before you obeyed the Senate'

However, the phrase  with the perfect tense means 'long ago':

 (Cicero)
'I heard this long ago, judges; I am sure there is none of you who hasn't often heard it'

 (Plautus)
'the crime, I say, was committed long ago; it is old and ancient'

Certain verbs, of which the most common are  'I remember',  'I hate', and  'I know', are used in the perfect tense but have the meaning of a present tense:
 (Cicero)
'I remember being present'

 (Catullus)
'even if you have forgotten, yet the gods remember'

 (Catullus)
'I hate and I love'

The future perfect and pluperfect of these verbs serve as the equivalent of a future or imperfect tense:  'I will remember',  'I remembered'.  has an imperative  'remember!' There is also a subjunctive which can be used in a hortatory sense:

 (Petronius)
'let us remember the living (not the dead)!' 

The verb  usually means 'I know':

 (Cicero)
'we don't know you, we don't know who you are, we have never seen you before'

But sometimes the perfect  has a past meaning, 'I became acquainted with' or 'I got to know':

 (Plautus)
'I am (the one you mentioned); but where on earth did you make my acquaintance or see me or ever converse with me?'

 (Caesar)
'this day generally makes the highest tides'

 vs 

In the verb  'I am', the imperfect tense  and the perfect  both mean 'I was', but in Latin there is usually a difference. As with other verbs, the perfect is usually used when the length of time is mentioned:

 (Livy)
'for a long time there was silence'

 (Cicero)
'for many years he was blind'

But if the situation was still continuing at the time referred to, the imperfect is used:

 (Livy)
'the cavalry battle had been in doubt for a long time already (and was still in doubt)'

The perfect is also used when the sentence describes an event rather than a state:

 (Livy)
'that year there were huge floods and the Tiber inundated the flat areas of the city'

 (Cicero)
'you were therefore there at Laeca's house that night, Catiline!' (i.e. you attended the meeting)

Another use of the perfect  is to describe a former state, emphasising that it is no longer in existence:

 (Petronius)
'I was once just like you are'

 (Livy) 
'there used to be a statue of Attus to the left of the senate house'

 (Virgil)
'we have ceased to be Trojans; Troy is no more'

However, if a time adverb such as  'once upon a time' is added, there is no need for the perfect tense and the imperfect  is more usual:

 (Horace)
'once I was a fig-wood log, a useless piece of timber'

 (Horace)
'I am not the kind of man I was under the rule of good Cinara'

The perfect is also used in sentences such as the following, which describe a permanent state, as opposed to the imperfect, which describes a temporary one:

 (Terence)
'my mother was a Samian; she was living in Rhodes (at that time)'

 (Caesar)
'among the Helvetians by far the noblest and the most wealthy was Orgetorix'

According to Pinkster, the use of erat in these two examples would sound wrong. 'In both cases the reader would want to know "What happened next?"'

For geographical description, on the other hand, erat is used, describing the landscape was it was at the time of the narrative:

 (Caesar)
'on that river there was a bridge'

'to the north there was a hill."

The use of  here would imply that there used to be a bridge, but that it has now gone. 

The perfect must also be used with adverbs such as  'once',  'twice',  'three times', which imply that the situation is now over:

 (Cicero)
'I have been in Bithynia twice'

The perfect is also used for something which has always been (or never been) the case:

 (Livy)
'we have never been enemies, always allies'

The adverb , when referring to a past period of time, can have either tense:

 (Nepos)
'on several occasions he was in charge of armies'

 (Ovid)
'often I was your judge, often your teacher'

There are also some types of sentences where either tense may be used indifferently, for example when describing someone's name or character:

 /  (Livy)
'his name was Manus' / 'his name was Dinomenes'

 /  (Nepos)
'he was a hard-working general' / 'he was an excellent general'

The equivalent of these two tenses, Spanish  and  both meaning 'I was', still exist in Spanish and Portuguese today. (See Spanish conjugation, Portuguese verb conjugation.)

Future perfect indicative
Formation

The future perfect active originally had a short -i-, while the perfect subjunctive had a long -ī-, but by the time of Cicero the two forms had become confused. It seems that Catullus and Cicero usually pronounced the future perfect with a long ī. Virgil has a short i for both tenses; Horace uses both forms for both tenses; Ovid uses both forms for the future perfect, but a long i in the perfect subjunctive.

1st conjugation: 
2nd conjugation: 
3rd conjugation (-ō): 
3rd conjugation (-iō): 
4th conjugation: 

Irregular verbs:
'I give': 
'I bear': 
'I go':  (rarely )
'I want': 
'I am': 
'I am able': 

Passive and deponent verbs

1st conjugation:  (rarely )
2nd conjugation: 
3rd conjugation (-ō): 
3rd conjugation (-iō): 
4th conjugation: 

Usage

Independent use

The future perfect is usually used in a sentence with  'if' or  'when' referring to future time, but it can sometimes be used on its own, as in the following sentences where it follows an imperative:

 (Plautus)
'I'm not sitting there; you sit there, I'll sit on the bench.'

 (Cicero)
'Pomponia, you invite the women, and (meanwhile) I will have summoned the men'

In the following passage with a future perfect is the call of Julius Caesar's eagle-bearer to his men when their boat reached the shore of Britain in 55 BC:

 (Caesar)
'Jump down, soldiers,' he said, 'unless you want to betray the eagle to the enemy. I will certainly have done my own duty for the republic and the commander!'

Sometimes both halves of a sentence (main clause and subordinate) can have the future perfect:

 (Cicero)
'whoever will have crushed (i.e. crushes) Antony, will have finished the war'

 (Nepos)
'enough will have been said, if I add this one thing'

 (Livy)
'you must see to it what is due to that man'

In temporal and conditional clauses

More frequently the future perfect tense is found after  'if' or  'when' in clauses referring to a future time. In such sentences English uses the present tense:
 (Livy)
'you will die, if you utter a sound!' (lit. 'if you will have uttered')

 (Catullus)
'then, when we have made many thousands (of kisses), we will muddle up the accounts'

 (Cicero)
'if anything happens, I'll let you know at once'

 (Cicero)
'if he sets out (lit. will be having set out), I will let you know'

 (Cicero)
'as you sow (lit. will have sown), so shall you reap'

 (Plautus)
'I'll remember, don't worry about that'

 (Cicero)
'I hate the man, and I always will'

Archaic future perfect

An ancient future or future perfect is sometimes found in early Latin ending in -sō: . The form  is often found in Plautus and Terence. It means something like 'I will make sure' or 'assuredly'. In Plautus it is often followed by a future indicative:

 (Plautus)
'assuredly you will know now'

But it can also be followed by a present subjunctive:

 (Plautus)
'I will see to it that you know'

The 2nd person ends in -is. The metre in the following example (a repeated u u – u –) shows that the -i- is short in the indicative, whereas the subjunctive has a long -i-:

 (Plautus)
'if you manage this, I'll give you some slippers, and a gold ring on your finger'

Apart from  the tense is rarely used in later Latin; but  occurs in Virgil:

 (Virgil) 
'the rest of the group should come with me and bring their weapons where I shall have ordered'

Quoting the above line, Seneca comments that  is equivalent to a future perfect:

 (Seneca)
'people in the old days used to say , that is, '

It is connected with the subjunctive ending in -sim and the future infinitive in -āssere, described below.

Pluperfect indicative
Formation

The pluperfect active is formed using the perfect stem (e.g. ) with the endings , e.g.  'I had led'

'I had been led',  'I had spoken'. But there is another pluperfect passive (often with a different meaning), which is discussed in a separate section below.

As with the perfect passive, the pluperfect passive tense can also have the auxiliary before the participle:

 ([Caesar])
'Cispius quickly reached the place to which he had been sent'

Usage

The pluperfect represents any meaning which the perfect tense can have, but transferred to a reference time in the past.

Prior event

The pluperfect can be used as in English to describe an event that had happened earlier than the time of the narrative:
 (Caesar)
'this nation had sent ambassadors to Caesar a few months previously'

 (Livy)
'he returned to Elatia by the same way he had come'

 (Cicero)
'on the day before I arrived in Athens he had departed for Mytilene'

Situation at a time in the past

Often the pluperfect can be used to describe the situation prevailing at a certain moment:

 (Curtius)
'the others had already departed; Clitus was going out last, without a light'

 (Livy)
'nor was Philip, who had arrived by now in Macedonia, preparing war less energetically'

 (Caesar)
'several men from the legions had been left behind in the camp sick'/
(or) 'there were several men from the legions in the camp who had been left behind because they were sick'

No longer existing situation

Just as the perfect tense can sometimes describe a situation that no longer exists at the present time (e.g. ), so the pluperfect can describe a situation which no longer existed at a time in the past, as in the following example:

 (Curtius)
'the river, which had once flowed (been flowing) though the middle of the town, was now flowing past outside the built-up area'

Pluperfect in temporal clauses

In subordinate clauses of the type 'whenever...', 'whoever...' etc. in past time the pluperfect indicative is used if the event precedes the event of the main clause. Usually in English the simple past is used:
 (Cicero)
'it was only whenever he saw a rose that he thought that spring was beginning'

 (Cicero)
'at the end of the journey, whenever he came to some town, he would be carried in the same litter straight into his bedroom'

In later writers such as Livy, the pluperfect subjunctive is used in a similar context.

Potential meaning ('would have')

Sometimes in a conditional clause a pluperfect indicative can have the meaning of a potential pluperfect subjunctive ('would have'), when it refers to an event which very nearly took place, but did not:
 (Florus)
'the war would have been completely finished, if (Caesar) had been able to crush Pompey at Brundisium'

 (Caesar)
'they remembered how they had put up with a great shortage at Alesia'

 (Cicero)
'I hated this man even more than I hated Clodius himself'

 (Cicero)
'he did not know Catiline, since the latter was at that time governor of Africa'

Perfect passive tenses made with fuī and fueram

These are referred to as 'double  forms' by de Melo. In early Latin, they seem to be slightly more common in deponent verbs than in passive ones, though in later Latin this difference is not found.

In classical Latin, although these tenses occur, they are only rarely used. In Plautus and Terence the perfect passive or deponent with  occurs 25 times compared with 1383 of the regular forms, and the pluperfect indicative with  9 times compared with the regular pluperfect 11 times. In Cicero they are rarer still: the numbers of examples of the six tenses above are 1, 6, 5, 5, 5, 2 respectively. 

For a long time it was rarely used. It remained rare in the Augustan period and does not occur at all in the travelogue of the pilgrim Egeria (4th century AD). Later, however, in the 7th-century Chronicle of Fredegar, it became more common. In modern Spanish and Portuguese, it is the regular way of forming the past tense passive (e.g. Spanish  'he was killed in the war', Portuguese  'it was built in 1982').

According to Woodcock, this is clearly a factor in the choice of tense. Often the correct nuance can be obtained by adding the word 'earlier' or 'previously'. In some cases, however, there is little difference in meaning from the ordinary perfect or pluperfect tense.

For the double perfect infinitive, see #Perfect infinitive with fuisse below.

Woodcock quotes the following example:

 (Gellius) 
'Sophocles was born before Euripides (was born)'

In the following examples, the double perfect refers to a situation which existed a long time earlier, before Ovid was exiled:

 (Ovid)
'you were moved at that time by the constancy of a long friendship, which began for me even before you were born'

 (Ovid)
'and as I was once accustomed (before I was exiled), I would perhaps have sat, one of a hundred men, as a judge of your words'

However, according to de Melo it is not always possible to tell from the context whether the tense with  refers to an anterior time or is merely a stylistic variation of an ordinary perfect passive.

 (Plautus)
'I came here on a boat; I am still feeling seasick'

 (Plautus)
'I (originally) sailed from here to Egypt'

In the following examples, both from the same scene, the meaning of the double perfect seems to be the same as an ordinary perfect:

 (Plautus)
'what I swore that I would do, I have done'

 (Plautus)
'what you ordered, I have done'

Similarly, the following two examples use different tenses, although the context is very similar and the meaning is the same:

 (Plautus)
'there's something which I almost forgot to say (earlier) in the house (i.e. before we left the house)'

 (Plautus)
'I forgot to tell you when we were inside just now'

There is a difference, however, since only the  form can be used in sentences like the following where the verb has a present perfect meaning:

 (Plautus)
'I don't know ... I've forgotten everything' 

Thus in the following example, according to the 19th-century grammarian Madvig, the words  do not describe an event but the state in which the temple of Janus was in:

 (Livy)
'since Numa's reign the temple of Janus has been in a closed state only twice'

It refers to a previous situation which has now changed:

 (Cicero)
'almost all the things which have now been included in the Arts were once dispersed and scattered'

De Melo cites the following example, where the second verb is obviously not anterior to the first:

 (Vitruvius)
'the pictures having been cut out were packed in wooden crates and were brought into the comitium'

An example is the following:

'and after that day no one dared to ask him any questions any more'

The following example, quoted by Woodcock, contrasts the two passive future perfect tenses. There is a clear difference in time between the two verbs:

 (Cicero) 
'whatever has (first) proved acceptable to you will be acceptable to him'

 (Caesar)
'the bridge, which earlier on had been broken by a storm, had now almost been rebuilt'

 (Caesar)
'for by this time they had used up the corn which had earlier been sown inside the defence walls 

 (Livy)
'indeed a rebellion in Gaul and Liguria, which had arisen earlier on at the beginning of that year, had soon been suppressed without much effort'

 (Petronius)
'nor had that cook yet slipped my mind, who had earlier on forgotten to gut the piglet'

 (Cicero)
'the weapons which had (previously) been fixed on the walls were found on the ground'

 (Livy)
'in the second half of the fight, Paulus, although (earlier on) right at the beginning of the battle he had been seriously wounded by a sling-shot, nonetheless several times went on to attack Hannibal, with his soldiers in close formation'

 (Cicero)
'as for what had been said (earlier) on the Ides that a debate would be held on the Campanian farmland, in the end it didn't take place'

The following example looks back to a conversation which had taken place at an earlier time and in another place:

 (Cicero)
'after this I came to those things which (earlier on) you and I had spoken about together in my Tusculan villa concerning your sister'

The following refers to a time in the distant past:

 (Nepos)
'he was content to live in the same house that Eurysthenes, the forefather of his ancestors, had once used'

Usually with this tense it is unnecessary to add an adverb meaning 'earlier', since it is implied in the tense, but in the following it is made explicit with the words :

 ([Caesar])
'and with the same facial expression and manner of speech which he had been accustomed to use previously whenever he went to bed, he secretly took a sword into his bedroom and stabbed himself with it'

In the following the meaning 'previously' or 'earlier on' is not explicit, but would fit the context:

 (Plautus)
'by chance (earlier on) I had forgotten to extinguish the lamp'

 (Propertius)
'I saw you (in a dream) confessing all the things which you had previously lied to me about'

Perfect tenses made with

Occasionally a perfect tense is made using the perfect participle combined with various tenses of the verb  'I have'. This became the regular way of forming the perfect tense in French and Italian.

According to Gildersleeve and Lodge, this form of the perfect 'is not a mere circumlocution for the Perfect, but lays particular stress on the maintenance of the result'. However, in some cases it can be translated simply as a perfect tense in English:

 (Cicero)
'As for Eros's accounts, although I haven't seen him in person, I have more or less learnt what they say from his letter'

 (Cicero)
'I have now thoroughly examined, learnt, and judged Clodius's mind'

In later Latin this construction became more common, for example:

 (Gregory of Tours, 6th century)
'you have invited the Bishop, and we have scarcely four jars of wine left!'

A variation with  'I hold or keep' is also sometimes found, but usually with emphasis on the idea of holding:
 (Cicero)
'an army of the Roman people is besieging Gnaeus Pompey, is keeping him fenced in (has fenced him in) with a ditch and wall, and preventing him from fleeing'

The future perfect of this idiom is made with :

 (Apuleius) 
'but I will have said enough about the letters if I add this one thing'

A pluperfect can similarly be made using one of the three past tenses of :

 (Caesar)
'Caesar sent ahead all the cavalry which he had gathered together from the whole province'

 (Livy)
'a knife, which she had hidden / was keeping hidden under her clothing, she stabbed it in her heart'

 (Caesar)
'Caesar had placed Lentulus Marcellinus the quaestor in charge of those defences'

(de Bello Hispaniensi)
'Pompeius had placed a camp in the mountains within sight of both towns'

(de Bello Alexandrino)
'and so they drew up and manned with fighters all the ships which they had earlier got ready for sailing'

These are used in indirect speech:

 (Cicero)
'(Verres is said to have claimed that) he had divided up that three-year period of his Sicilian praetorship in such a way that...'

(Quintilian)
'you confess that you had hidden the gold / were keeping it hidden'

 (Terence)
'I would promise you that, as soon as he got married, I split up with Pamphilus and was keeping him away from me'

 (Cicero)
'the people of Caunus also owe him money, but they say that they had already deposited a sum of money'

Periphrastic future tenses

It describes a person's intention at the present time. It can be translated with 'going to', 'planning to', 'intending to', or by using the future continuous 'I'll be doing':
 (Cicero)
'Paulla Valeria is going to marry Decimus Brutus'

 (Cicero)
'I'm not going to leave until the money is paid'

Despite its name, the future periphrastic tense  is really a present tense, describing a person's present intentions. For this reason, it can have a future form , used for example in future conditional or future temporal clauses:
 (Cicero)
'but if you come to any arrangement with Silius, even if it is on the very day I'll be arriving at Sicca's house, please let me know'

 (Martial)
'daring Leander was shouting in the swelling waves: "drown me, waves, when I'll be coming back"'

A past version of the periphrastic future can be made with the imperfect tense of sum, describing what someone's intentions were at a moment in the past:
 (Servius to Cicero)
'on the next day he was intending to sail to Italy'

 (Ovid)
'when she saw her face and horns in the water, "o poor me!" she was going to say, but no words came out'

In a conditional sentence this tense can mean 'would have done':
 (Ovid)
'I was going to remove the faults (i.e. I would have removed them), if I had been free to do it'

 (Seneca)
'on the day Cato was defeated in the election, he played; on the night he was going to die, he read'

This tense can also be potential, expressing the meaning 'would have done':
 (Curtius)
'if I had not obeyed you, I would rightly have paid the penalty'

An example of this tense is the following:

 (Livy)
'... whom the Senate had been intending to order should be declared dictator'

Tenses with the gerundive

The gerundive of the verb (an adjectival form ending in -ndus) can be combined with the verb  'I am' to make a passive periphrastic tense. This usually expresses what is needing to be done:
 (Pliny)
'I don't need to be asked or encouraged' (i.e. I will do it willingly)

 (Celsus)
'tumours of this kind need to be lanced'

Negative meaning

The negative gerundive usually means 'not needing to be', as in the first example above or the first example below. However, sometimes the interpretation 'ought not to be' or 'it isn't possible for it to be' is more appropriate:
 (Seneca)
'you do not need to be reminded now that no one is good except the wise man'

 (Ovid)
'the story of Achilles shouldn't (or can't) be told using the metre of Callimachus'

Impersonal construction

Very often the passive periphrastic is used impersonally, together with a dative of the agent:

 (Cicero)
'a decision needs to be made by you today'

The impersonal form of this tense can also be made using intransitive verbs such as  'I go' and verbs such as  'I persuade' and  'I use' which do not take an accusative object:

 (Cicero)
'there is no need to reply to everything'

 (Cicero)
'I have to go to Arpinum'

 (Cicero)
'you must use your judgement'

An example of a future gerundive periphrastic is the following:
 (Cicero)
'since that isn't possible, we will need to ask my friend, Marcus Plaetorius'

An example of the imperfect passive periphrastic is the following:
 (Cicero)
'he was afraid not only of those things which needed to be feared, but everything'

As with the active perfect periphrastic, in a conditional sentence the perfect gerundive periphrastic tense can mean 'would have done':
 (Livy)
'if you had delayed just one day, you would all have died'

Another meaning of the perfect passive is 'ought to have been done':
 (Cicero)
'either his army should have been taken away or the command should have been given to him'

In the following result clause, this tense becomes subjunctive:

 (Cicero)
'what you write about Pomptinus is correct: for the fact is that, if he is going to be in Brundisium before the 1st June, it wasn't so necessary for Marcus Anneius and Lucius Tullius to have been urged to hurry'

The active future perfect periphrastic tense is not found, but the passive occurs:
 (Vitruvius)
'whenever (at some future time) it is necessary for a building to be made (using local stone), the stones for it should be quarried two years in advance'

Gerundive of time only
Occasionally the gerundive has the meaning of a simple future passive, without any sense of obligation. However, this is generally only found in post-classical Latin, as in the following examples from Eutropius (4th century AD) and the Historia Augusta (4th or 5th century AD):

 (Eutropius)
'when Hannibal was about to be handed over to the Romans, he drank poison'

 (Hist. Aug.)
'he found out that he was going to be adopted by Trajan'

For other examples of gerundive infinitive tenses see #Gerundive infinitives below.

Subjunctive tenses

The subjunctive has four main tenses: present, imperfect, perfect, and pluperfect; there are also a number of periphrastic tenses. There is no future subjunctive, although to avoid ambiguity in indirect speech a periphrastic future can be used.

Of these subjunctive tenses, the present and perfect are primary tenses, and are mainly used where the main verb of the sentence has a present or future meaning; while the imperfect and pluperfect are secondary or historic tenses, and are mainly used when the main verb has a past or an unreal potential meaning. However, there are sometimes exceptions: see #Sequence of tenses rule below for further details.

The subjunctive mood has a variety of uses in Latin. It can be optative (used in wishes), jussive ('should', 'is to'), or potential ('would', 'could', 'may', 'might'). It is also frequently used in indirect speech, in causal clauses, in circumstantial clauses after  'when' in past time, and when imagining a hypothetical situation.

Present subjunctive
Formation

Active verbs form their present subjunctive in -em, -am, or -im, depending on the verb, as follows:
1st conjugation: 
2nd conjugation: 
3rd conjugation (-ō): 
3rd conjugation (-iō): 
4th conjugation: 

Irregular verbs:
 'I give': 
 'I bear': 
 'I go': 
 'I want': 
 'I don't want': 
 'I prefer': 
 'I am': 
 'I am able': 

Passive and deponent verbs:
1st conjugation: 
2nd conjugation: 
3rd conjugation (-ō): 
3rd conjugation (-iō): 
4th conjugation: 

Usage

The present subjunctive very frequently describes an event which the speaker wishes, commands, or suggests should happen at a future time:

 (Cicero)
'I hope I may see that day!'

 (Catullus)
'let's live, my Lesbia, and let's love'

 (Gellius)
'let him sit here!'

The negative of this meaning is :

 (Cicero)
'may I not live if I know!'

 (Cicero)
'let them go out, let them depart; let them not allow poor Catiline to waste away with desire for them!'

Usually, the jussive subjunctive is used in the 2nd person only when the person is indefinite:

 (Virgil)
'may you arise, some avenger, from our bones!'

However, in the following example from Plautus, the 2nd person is used for politeness when a young slave girl is talking to a man:

 (Plautus)
'I'm going inside, unless there's anything you want.' – 'Please go.'

The present subjunctive is also used in deliberative questions (which are questions which expect an imperative answer):

 (Cicero)
'what action should I take about Pompey?'

Another use of the present subjunctive is concessive:

 (Cicero)
'he may be a thief; nonetheless he is a good general!'

In philosophical discourse, the present subjunctive represents a hypothetical situation which is imagined as happening at an indefinite time:

 (Cicero)
'let us suppose that a good man is selling a house'

In an 'ideal' conditional clause, the speaker imagines a hypothetical event or situation in the future. The negative of this meaning is :

 (Cicero)
'if I were to deny that this road is a rough one, I would be lying'

 (Cicero)
'if your country were to say this to you, wouldn't it be right for her to be granted her request?'

In early Latin, a present subjunctive can also be used to make an unreal conditional referring to the present:

 (Plautus)
'I wouldn't be asking you, if I knew'

However, there was a gradual shift in usage, and in the classical period, and even sometimes in Plautus, the imperfect subjunctive is used in such clauses.

Occasionally in poetry a present subjunctive can be used to refer to an unreal past event, where in prose a pluperfect subjunctive would be used in both halves of the sentence: 

 (Virgil)
'if his learned companion had not warned him, Aeneas would have rushed in and would have beaten aside the ghosts with his sword in vain'

In a conditional clause of comparison ('as if...') the use of tenses is different from the normal unreal conditional clause. Here the main clause is in the indicative or imperative, and the 'if'-clause follows the sequence of tenses rule, with present or perfect subjunctive for an imaginary present situation, and imperfect or pluperfect for an imaginary past one:

 (Quintilian)
'don't be nervous as if you are giving a penny to an elephant'

When a conditional sentence expresses a generalisation, the present subjunctive is used for any 2nd person singular verb, whether in the subordinate clause or the main clause:

 (Cato)
'if you use iron a lot, it gets worn away'

 (Seneca)
'old age is full of pleasure, if you know how to enjoy it'

 (Plautus)
'whenever there's a shortage of something, you want it'

One of the most common uses of the subjunctive is to indicate reported speech (or implied reported speech). After a present tense main verb, the present subjunctive is usual, for example in the following indirect command:

 (Livy)
'she sends a messenger (to say) that they should come'

When a question is made indirect, the verb is always changed into the subjunctive mood, as in the following example: 

 (Catullus)
'do you perhaps ask why I do that?'

After , if the context is clearly future, a present or imperfect subjunctive can sometimes represent a future tense or potential subjunctive:

 (Caesar)
'they said that if these things were reported to Ariovistus, they didn't doubt that he would put them all to death'

Similarly in the protasis ('if' clause) of a conditional sentence in indirect speech, a present subjunctive can represent an original future indicative:

 (Caesar)
'(Ariovistus told Caesar that) if he did not retreat and withdraw his army, he would treat him as an enemy'

In other examples in reported speech, the subjunctive in the 'if' clause represents an original present subjunctive with potential meaning:

 (Cicero)
'I believe that Pleasure, if she were to speak for herself, would give way to Dignity'

In Latin a clause of fearing is constructed like a negative wish ("may it not happen!"). For this reason fears usually start with the negative particle . If the speaker fears that something may not happen, the two negatives  and  can be combined:

 (Cicero)
'I am afraid that I may not be granted my wish'

The present subjunctive is also used in purpose clauses with  such as the following:

 (Rhētorica ad Herennium)
'you should eat so that you can live, not live so that you can eat'

The present subjunctive may also be used in consecutive clauses following a present tense verb:

 (Cicero)
'he finds the idea of marrying so abhorrent that he denies there is anything more pleasant than a single bed'

After the word  'perhaps' and occasionally after  'perhaps', the present subjunctive can mean 'may' or 'could', expressing a possibility. The first example below uses the present subjunctive, and the second the perfect:

 (Cicero)
'this may perhaps seem harsh'

A relative clause which is indefinite uses the subjunctive mood in Latin. This is known as a generic relative clause:

 (Cicero)
'but there are also some who are saying, Roman citizens, that it was by me that Catiline was sent into exile'

The subjunctive mood is also used in clauses which have a causal meaning ('in view of the fact that'), such as after causal . Any tense can be used including the present:

 (Cicero)
'since these things are so'

Imperfect subjunctive
Formation

The imperfect subjunctive, even in passive and deponent verbs, looks like an active infinitive with an ending:
1st conjugation:  (-em, -ēs, -et, -ēmus, -ētis, -ent)
2nd conjugation: 
3rd conjugation: 
4th conjugation: 

Irregular verbs:
 'I give':  (with short -a-)
 'I bear': 
 'I go': 
 'I want: 
 'I am unwilling':  
 'I prefer': 
 'I am': 
 'I am able': 
 'I become / am made': 

Passive and deponent verbs:

1st conjugation passive:  (-er, -ēris/-ēre, -ētur, -ēmur, -ēminī, -entur)
2nd conjugation passive: 
3rd conjugation passive: 
4th conjugation passive: 

Usage

The imperfect subjunctive is used in situations similar to the present subjunctive above, but in a past-time context. 

The imperfect and pluperfect subjunctives can describe something which should have been done in the past, but which it is now too late for:

 (Virgil)
'you should have remained true to your words, o Alban!'

 (Cicero)
'he should have died, you will say'

 (Virgil)
'what was I to do?'

This usage is quite common in Plautus but rare in later Latin.

The imperfect subjunctive can also be used to represent an imagined or wished for situation in present time:

 (Cicero)
'if only Servius Sulpicius were alive (now)!'

In a conditional clause representing an unreal situation in present time, the imperfect subjunctive is used in both clauses:

 (Cicero)
'I would write more about this to you, if you were in Rome'

 (Cicero)
'if the whole of Sicily were speaking with one voice, she would say this'

 (Plautus)
'if he were inside, I would call him out'

Sometimes, however, an imperfect subjunctive refers to an unreal situation in the past rather than the present:

 (Cicero)
'if this man had been in his right mind (at that time), would he have dared to lead out an army?' 

The 2nd person imperfect subjunctive when potential is nearly always indefinite and generalising, i.e. an imaginary 'you':

 (Livy)
'you would have believed them beaten'

In a conditional clause of comparison, the imperfect subjunctive indicates an imagined situation not at the present time but contemporary with the main verb:

 (Livy)
'fear overcame the senators as great as if the enemy were already at the gates'

For other examples of this see Latin conditional clauses#Conditional clauses of comparison.

In indirect questions in a historic context, an imperfect subjunctive usually represents the transformation of a present indicative. In the examples below the imperfect subjunctive represents a situation which is contemporary with the main verb:

 (Cicero)
'Epaminondas asked whether his shield was safe'

 (Curtius)
'nor did the Persians doubt that, now that Issus had been abandoned, the Macedonians were fleeing'

In other sentences, however, the imperfect subjunctive is prospective; that is, it represents an action which is future relative to the main verb: (In indirect sentences of this kind there is in fact no difference between the vivid future and the ideal future conditional.)

 (Cicero)
'and I didn't doubt that, if the republican government were restored, it would bring me back with it'

 (Livy)
'with the intention of remaining inactive no doubt, unless (at some future time) the Etruscans were to attack of their own accord'

The imperfect subjunctive is also used for indirect commands, clauses of fearing or indirect questions after a main verb in the past tense:

 (Nepos) 
'he gave him an order that he should go round all the doors of the building'

 (Nepos)
'the Spartans sent ambassadors to Athens in order to accuse him in his absence'

 (Nepos)
'fearing that he might be handed over to the Romans, he came to Crete'

 (Livy)
'fearing that if he were to go without the permission of the consuls, he might be caught and dragged back by the Roman guards, he approached the senate'

It can also have a prospective or future meaning in a relative clause:

 (Cicero)
'before dawn he announced those vows which he was never to fulfil'

After verbs meaning 'it happened that...', the imperfect subjunctive is always used even of a simple perfective action, which, if the grammatical construction did not require a subjunctive, would be expressed by a perfect indicative:

 (Nepos)
'it happened that in a single night all the statues of Hermes were thrown down except one'

Following  'when, while', however, the imperfect subjunctive has the meaning of an imperfect indicative. This is very common:
 (Cicero)
'while I was sitting at home in a sad mood,' he said, 'Venerius came running up'

 (Ovid)
'when I was strolling with slow steps along the beach, as I often do, at the top of the sand, the god of the sea saw me and fell in love'

Perfect subjunctive
Formation

1st conjugation:  (-erim, -erīs, -erit, -erīmus, -erītis, -erint) 
2nd conjugation: 
3rd conjugation: 
4th conjugation:  (rarely )

Passive and deponent verbs:





In some cases there is a difference in meaning between the two forms (see below).

Usage

The perfect subjunctive sometimes expresses a wish for the past, leaving open the possibility that it may have happened:

 (Cicero)
'may I have prophesied correctly!'

 (Cicero)
'perhaps I have acted rashly'

It can also be used in a concessive meaning:
 (Cicero)
'he may have been so to others; when did begin to be so to you?'

The perfect subjunctive can also be used in a wish for the future, but this use is described as 'archaic'.

 (Cicero)
'but may the gods avert this omen!'

With the negative particle  the perfect subjunctive can express a negative command:

'you should not fear death'

Sometimes the perfect subjunctive refers to present or future time, and means 'could'. For example, in the following idiom the perfect is usual:

 (Cicero)
'I couldn't easily say (= I don't think) that I have ever seen anything more beautiful'

In the following sentence both 'could' and 'could have' are possible:

 (Livy)
'I could have written that the number of captives was as many as sixty, if I were to follow the Greek authority'

In other examples, however, the perfect subjunctive definitely refers to the past and means 'could have done' or 'would have done':

 (Livy)
'either of these passes would have brought (Hannibal) down to the Libuan Gauls'

The perfect tense may also (but rarely) sometimes be used in an ideal condition, describing an imagined hypothetical situation in the future:

 (Juvenal)
'these days (if he were to come back to life) no one would give Cicero even two hundred coins, unless a huge ring glittered (on his finger)'

 (Plautus)
'if I were to hang myself now, I would simply end up having given pleasure to my enemies'

In the following sentence, in which a conditional clause is used in reported speech, the perfect subjunctive is equivalent to a future perfect indicative in :

 (Caesar)[33]
'they said that if these things were reported to Ariovistus, they didn't doubt that he would put them all to death'

The perfect subjunctive is also found in subordinate clauses in indirect statements, usually when the main verb is in the present tense. This also applies to when the indirect speech is only implied rather than explicit, as in the following sentences:

 (Cicero)
'Caesar is pardoning me by means of a letter for the fact that I didn't come'

 (Plautus)
'my mother is angry because I didn't return'

The perfect subjunctive usually represents what would be a perfect indicative in an independent clause. However, since there is no way of expressing an imperfect tense in primary sequence except using the perfect subjunctive, it could also sometimes represent an imperfect indicative.

 (Nepos)
'from this it will be easily conjectured how dear he was to his people'

 (Cicero)
'we do not yet know what the ambassadors have done' (or 'were doing', or 'did')

 (Seneca the Elder)
'I don't know whether I was standing or sitting'

 (Cicero)
'I have no doubt that you were very busy' (original  or )

In consecutive (result) clauses, the sequence of tenses rule is not so strictly adhered to. For example, in the following, the perfect subjunctive  is used, despite the fact that the main verb is historic: 

 (Cicero)
'he showed himself to be so tough and energetic that no one ever saw him sitting on a horse'

The subjunctive is also used in various types of relative clause. The following is an explanatory relative clause ('inasmuch as' or 'in view of the fact that'):

 (Cicero)
'I must be blind that I didn't see this before!'

The following is generic or indefinite:
 (Cicero)
'there was no one in Lilybaeum who did not see it'

The following is a restrictive relative clause:

 (Cicero)
'the speeches of Cato, at least such as I have discovered'

 (Cicero)
'a guilty man cannot be condemned unless he has first been accused'

In the following examples, the perfect subjunctives with  contrast with the ordinary perfect subjunctive tenses, and apparently refer to an earlier event:

 (Livy)
'whether this was noticed too late, or whether (before it was noticed) some trick was suspected, is unknown'

 (Livy)
'whether they did this of their own accord or whether it was because they already had instructions to do so is not certain'

In the following example, however, the tense may have been chosen simply for euphony rather than meaning:
 (Virgil)
'may it turn out that Trojan ill-fortune has followed us this far, no further!'

Pluperfect subjunctive

Formation

1st conjugation:  (less often ) (-ssem, -ssēs, -sset, -ssēmus, -ssētis, -ssent) 
2nd conjugation: 
3rd conjugation: 
4th conjugation:  (rarely )

Irregular verbs:

Passive and deponent verbs:
1st conjugation: 
2nd conjugation: 
3rd conjugation: 
4th conjugation: 

In some cases there is a difference in meaning between the two forms (see below).

Scholars are unclear whether this is an archaic survival or whether it is merely a "syncopated" (shortened) form of the usual tense. (For examples, see below.)

Unreal situation or wish

The pluperfect subjunctive can be used to make a wish which cannot now be fulfilled about a situation in the past:
 (Cicero)
'if only he had led out all his forces with him!'

In the following sentence, the imperfect subjunctive  is used to wish for something that cannot now come true, while the present subjunctive  leaves open the possibility that it may be true:

 (Cicero)
'I wish it had been true about Menedemus; I hope it may be true about the queen'

The jussive pluperfect is also fairly uncommon. The following examples are from Cicero, again using the negative :

 (Cicero)
'you shouldn't have asked'

 (Cicero)
'what was it your duty to do? you ought to have returned the money, you ought not to have bought the corn'

In the following sentence, using the pluperfect subjunctive, according to one view, Queen Dido contemplates what 'might have been':

 (Virgil)
'I could have carried torches into the camp and filled the gangways with flames'

Others see the pluperfect subjunctive in this sentence as a wish ('if only I had carried!'); others again as jussive ('I ought to have carried!').

The pluperfect subjunctive in conditional clauses is used for referring to unreal events in past time. This usage is found as early as Plautus:

 (Plautus)
'if you had called him, he would have replied'

It is also possible for the protasis to be imperfect subjunctive, and the apodosis pluperfect subjunctive, or the other way round, as in the following examples:

 (Seneca)
'how would you react, if you had lost a friend?'

 (Livy)
'therefore if I had not given birth, Rome would not now be being attacked; if I did not have a son, I would have died as a free woman in a free country'

In a temporal clause
Another very common use of the pluperfect subjunctive is in a circumstantial -clause.

 (Cicero)
'when he heard this, he is said to have hurried to Rome'

Indirect speech
In indirect speech, the pluperfect subjunctive is often a transformation of a perfect indicative in direct speech. In the following example, the original direct question would have had the perfect tense:

 (Cicero)
'I asked Catiline whether he had been at a night-time meeting at Marcus Laeca's house or not'

In some sentences, the pluperfect subjunctive is a reflection of an original imperfect indicative, as in the following example, where the original verbs would have been  and :

 (Livy)
'[he said] that they begged just one favour, that they should be not assigned lower ranks than those which they had held when they were on military service'

In other sentences in indirect speech, the pluperfect subjunctive is a transformation of a future perfect indicative, put into historic sequence. The original words of the following sentence would have been  'if you do (will have done) otherwise, you will be doing Caesar a disservice':

 (Cicero)
'he said that if the man were to do otherwise, he would be doing Caesar a disservice'

 (Livy)
'at this critical moment in the battle, the propraetor vowed games to Jupiter, if he routed and slaughtered the enemies'

Syncopated pluperfect subjunctive

A shortened or "syncopated" form of the pluperfect subjunctive ending in -sem instead of -sissem is sometimes found, although it is not very common. The following comes from Horace's well-known account of his journey to Brundisium:

 (Horace) 
'(mountains) which we would never have crawled to the end of, had not a nearby villa in Trivicum welcomed us'

Another example comes from Plautus:

 (Plautus)
'thank God you understand, for if you hadn't understood, you would never let the subject drop, I'm sure!'

In the following example, the subjunctive is used to indicate indirect speech:

 (Plautus)
'he told me that as soon as the life had left his father's body, he had sold his farm'

The following from Virgil describes what might have been, or should have been:

 (Virgil)
'I could have (or should have) extinguished son and father along with their family!'

R. D. Williams describes the following example as "jussive":

 (Virgil)
'he, to whom either God or his own right hand had given life, should have lived'

In the following example, Cicero contrasts the time when Marcus Claudius Marcellus captured Syracuse (3rd century BC) with the period when Gaius Verres was governor of Sicily (73–70 BC):

 (Cicero)
'the harbour of the Syracusans, which at that time had been closed both to our fleets and to the Carthaginians', in the period of Verres' praetorship was laid wide open to a pirate vessel of Cilicians and to robbers'

 (Cicero)
'I would have waited for your letter at Brundisium, if it had been permitted by the sailors'

 (Cicero)
'if it had been permitted to me by your legions to come to the senate, I would have done so'

Because the feminine participle +  makes a suitable ending for a hexameter, it is possible that in the following examples the double pluperfect is merely used for metrical convenience, rather than indicating an anterior time. In the first example, which is spoken by the ghost of Hector to Aeneas, encouraging him to flee from Troy, the tense with  refers to an earlier time when Hector was still alive:

 (Virgil)
'if Troy could be defended by anyone's right hand, it would have been defended (while I was still alive) even by this one'

The following unfulfillable wish also uses the double pluperfect subjunctive passive:

 (Virgil)
'I wish she had never been seized by such love of warfare or attempted to provoke the Trojans!'

Another example comes from Ovid, referring to the time before the Trojan War started:

 (Ovid) 
'if Tyndareus' daughter had not previously been raped, there would be peace between Europe and Asia'

In the following example Ovid describes the fate of the Athenian princess Aglauros, who was turned to stone out of envy for her sister:

 (Ovid)
'she did not try to speak, nor, even if she had tried, would she have had any way of speaking'

Subjunctive tenses formed with the future participle

Unlike in clauses following , in indirect questions referring to a future time the periphrastic future subjunctive is regularly used:

 (Cicero)
'it is uncertain what he is going to do'

In indirect statements and questions, the active periphrastic future can represent a future or periphrastic future tense of direct speech in primary sequence. In this case there is not necessarily any idea of planning or intention, although there may be:
 (Cicero)
'I don't know when I'm going to see you'

 (Cicero)
'let me know in detail what you are doing and whether at all you'll be coming to Italy this winter'

This tense can also be used in primary sequence reported speech, to represent the main clause in either an ideal conditional sentence or a simple future one (the distinction between these two disappears in indirect speech):

 (Cicero)
'we ourselves have never seen such a (perfectly wise) man; but it is explained in the opinions of philosophers what such a person would be like, if one were ever to exist'

To avoid ambiguity, the periphrastic future can also be used when the meaning is future, although this is not as common as in indirect questions:

 (Cicero)
'I have no doubt you are going to remain (in the villa) at Formiae'

The same meaning is expressed in indirect questions in a past context:

 (Cicero)
'people were waiting to see what exactly he was going to do'

If the main verb is in past time, an imperfect version of the periphrastic future subjunctive is used:
 (Cicero)
'I wasn't sure whether you were going to receive this letter'

 (Sallust)
'he said that he had come to ask him whether he was intending to make peace or war'

 (Curtius)
'he ordered Ptolemy to terrify the Indians with shouting, as if he was about to swim across the river'

A perfect periphrastic subjunctive can be used with a conditional meaning ('would have done') in hypothetical conditional clauses in indirect questions in primary sequence. In this case it represents a pluperfect subjunctive in the original direct speech:
 (Livy)
'tell us, Appius Claudius, what you would have done, if you had been censor at that time?'

 (Cicero)
'can anyone doubt that if Quintus Ligarius had been able to be in Italy, he would have been of the same opinion as his brothers were?'

In an indirect question, the perfect periphrastic subjunctive can also sometimes reflect a potential imperfect subjunctive:
 (Seneca)
'imagine how much speed you would be putting on, if an enemy were threatening you from behind!'

These tenses can be compared with the similar examples with the perfect periphrastic infinitive cited below, where a conditional sentence made in imperfect subjunctives is converted to an indirect statement.

The pluperfect version of the periphrastic subjunctive can be used in a circumstantial  clause:
 (Cicero)
'when Antony had been about to bring some motion about the republic, a message suddenly arrived about the 4th legion and he lost his composure'

It can also be used in conditional sentences after , as in the following sentence from an imaginary letter from Helen to Paris:
 (Ovid)
'by flatteries such as these, if I had been going to sin, I might have been persuaded'

Once in Cicero it occurs in the apodosis of an unreal conditional, referring to the inevitability of fate:

 (Cicero) 
'even if he had obeyed the auspices, the same thing would have been destined to happen; for the fates cannot be changed'

It can also reflect a potential pluperfect subjunctive ('would have done') in historic sequence in an indirect question:
 (Livy)
'it occurred to them how impossible Etruria would have been, if anything had gone wrong in Samnium'

From this is formed a subjunctive . This is not used in Caesar, but is common in Livy, Sallust, and Nepos. It is used especially in conditional sentences, either in the protasis ('if' clause) or the apodosis (main clause), and it generally has either a potential or future-in-the past meaning. However, occasionally it seems to be simply a variation on the imperfect subjunctive .

 (Livy)
'Tullus ordered him to keep the young men armed; he would need their help if (at some future time) there was a war with the people of Veii'

 (Cicero)
'(he was confident) that even if (the pain) were to be very great, it would be brief'

It can also be used with a future-in-the-past meaning in sentences like the following, which are not conditional but indirect speech:

 (Cicero)
'he said that he would far rather die in his own bed, whatever might happen in future'

 (Sallust)
'and it is said that he did this so that (in future) they would be more trustworthy to one other'

 (Livy)
'some were standing still, uncertain whether it would be safer to go forward or to retreat into the camp'

 (Gellius)
'Aristotle replied that he would do what they wanted when it was a suitable time for him'

In the following sentence the imperfect is typical of letter-writing. An English writer would say 'I have no doubt that he will be...':

 (Cicero)
'(at the time of writing this) I personally had no doubt that he would be in Apulia any moment now'

 (Ovid)
'if it were made of ash-wood, it would be light in colour; if cornel-wood, there would be a knot in it'

In some authors, such as Livy and Sallust, a potential meaning can be given to the pluperfect subjunctive passive by substituting  for :

 (Livy)
'and the army would have been annihilated if the woods hadn't provided cover for those who were fleeing'

 (Livy)
'and the city would have been besieged, if the consul Horatius had not been recalled'

 (Sallust)
'but if Catiline had not been late in giving his allies a sign in front of the senate, on that day the worst crime in the history of Rome would have been committed'

In other authors, however, the same meaning is expressed using the ordinary pluperfect passive:

 ([Caesar])
'but if night hadn't interrupted the battle, Caesar would have gained control of the whole enemy fleet'

When used in indirect speech, sometimes this tense is the equivalent of a future perfect passive in the original speech:

 (Sallust)
'he was seeking the consulship, hoping that if he should be elected he would easily manage Antony according to his pleasure'

 (Livy)
'the senators began to be afraid that if the army were dismissed, there would be further secret meetings and conspiracies'

 (Gellius)
'for fear that, if those letters were to be captured by the enemy, their plans might be known, they used to send letters made in this way'

 (Cicero)
'the oracle told Priam that he should forbear to raise the first son who was going to be born to him subsequently'

 (Plautus)
'although he knew that you would do whatever was (going to be) told to you'

In each of the above sentences,  looks to the future, relative to a point in the past. In the following sentences, however, it has a past, not future, meaning:

 (Terence)
'if I had ever seemed either of these things to you, I wouldn't have been made a mockery of by your deeds in this way'

 (Livy)
'blaming one another because, when it had been possible, not all the enemy fleet had been sunk or captured'

Archaic forms of the subjunctive

 (Terence)
'do you know where she is?'

This occurs occasionally in Plautus and also once in Lucretius (4.635) and once in Virgil's Aeneid, where the archaic form is presumably appropriate for the speech of the god Jupiter:
 (Virgil)
'whether it be Trojan or Rutulian, I shall make no distinction!'

It occurs mostly in Plautus and Terence, but sometimes also in Cicero, in phrases like the following:
 (Plautus)
'may the gods destroy you!'

From  'I touch' comes a subjunctive  used by both Plautus and Terence:

 (Plautus)
'do not touch me!'

The idiomatic expression  'only, exactly, as far as concerns' is thought to preserve another archaic subjunctive of  'I touch'.

In old Latin, a form of the subjunctive with -s-, known as the sigmatic aorist subjunctive, is preserved ( etc.). One use of this is for wishes for the future:

 (Plautus)
'may the gods preserve you always!'

 (Cicero)
'may the gods ensure that it be allowed'

 (Plautus)
'may Jupiter protect you from that!'

In Plautus this subjunctive is also used in prohibitions, when it exists:
 (Plautus)
'don't worry about me!'

It also occurs once in Terence:
 (Terence)
'please don't call me by that name again!'

In other phrases it has a potential meaning and can be translated with 'would':
 (Plautus)
'I would willingly do him harm!'

 (Livy)
'I do not know exactly, nor, if I knew, would I dare to say'

Sequence of tenses rule
Latin speakers used subjunctive verbs to report questions, statements, and ideas. When the verb of telling or asking in the dominant clause is primary, the subjunctive verb in the dependent clause must also be primary; when the verb in the dominant clause is secondary or historic, the subjunctive verb in the dependent clause must also be in a historic tense. This rule can be illustrated with the following table:

This rule applies to all kinds of sentences where the dependent verb is put in the subjunctive mood, for example indirect speech, indirect questions, indirect commands, purpose clauses, most consecutive clauses, clauses after verbs of fearing,  clauses and others. It does not apply to more loosely connected dependent clauses, such as relative clauses, where the verb is in the indicative.

The perfect tense appears in both rows, depending on whether it has a present perfect meaning ('have done', primary) or past simple meaning ('did', historic). But even when it has a present perfect meaning it is often treated as a historic tense (see further below).

Examples of primary sequence

Some examples of primary sequence are the following:

Present indicative + present subjunctive: 
 (Cicero) 
'they ask where it is'

Present subjunctive + present subjunctive:
 (Cicero)
'I hope it is true'

Present imperative + periphrastic perfect subjunctive:
 (Livy)
'tell us what you would have done'

Present indicative + Perfect subjunctive:
 (Cicero)
'I wonder what the reason was that you changed your plan'

Examples of historic sequence

Imperfect indicative + imperfect subjunctive:
 (Cicero)
'people were asking where he was'

Imperfect subjunctive + pluperfect subjunctive:
 (Cicero)
'I wish it had been true'

Perfect indicative + imperfect subjunctive:
 (Cicero)
'the Senate decreed that he should go at once'

Historic infinitive + imperfect subjunctive:
 (Sallust)
'he constantly urged that they be always on their guard and prepared'

Perfect tense main verb

When the main verb is a perfect tense, it is usually considered to be a historic tense, as in the above example. Occasionally, however, when the meaning is that of an English present perfect, the perfect in a main clause may be taken as a primary tense, for example:
 (Cicero)
'I haven't yet quite made my mind up whether our friend Trebatius has brought me more trouble or pleasure'

 (Plautus)
'he has sent me home ahead of him so that I can take this news to his wife'

However, the historic sequence after a perfect with present perfect meaning is also very common, for example:
 (Cicero)
'you have compelled me to confess'

 (Plautus)
'at last I've got him to go away!'

Historic present main verb

When the main verb is a historic present, the dependent verb may be either primary or historic, but is usually primary:
 (Livy)
'she sends a message that they should come' (both verbs primary)

 (Livy)
'they send ambassadors (who were) to ask for peace' (second verb historic)

Sometimes both primary and historic are found in the same sentence. In the following example the first dependent verb  is primary sequence, but  is pluperfect:
 (Cicero)
'he asked him to pay attention to what he had said'

Exceptions

There are frequent exceptions to the sequence of tenses rule, especially outside of indirect speech. For example, in the following sentence, a historic tense is followed by a perfect subjunctive:

 (Cicero)
'what soldier was there who did not see her in Brundisium?'

In consecutive clauses also, a perfect tense in the main clause is often followed by a present or a perfect subjunctive:

 (Cicero)
'Verres so harried Sicily for three years that it cannot be restored to its original state.'

In indirect conditional sentences, the periphrastic perfect subjunctive often remains even after a historic-tense main verb:

 (Livy)
'nor was there any doubt that if they had been able, the enemies would have turned their backs'

The perfect tense  also can replace a pluperfect tense with the meaning 'could have' even after a historic verb:

 (Livy)
'there was no doubt that, if that delay had not intervened, the Carthaginian camp could have been captured on that day'

Caesar and Sallust can sometimes use a present subjunctive in historic sequence when the meaning is jussive (although this practice is not always followed):

 (Sallust)
'he replied that if they wished to make any request from the Senate, they should disarm'

In general, in Livy, there is a tendency for a present or perfect tense of the original speech to be retained in historic sequence, while Cicero is more strict in following the historic sequence.

When the main verb is primary, an imperfect or pluperfect subjunctive in a clause that is already subordinate in the original sentence may often remain:

 (Livy)
'tell us what you would have done if you had been censor?'

In the following, a perfect subjunctive (a primary tense) is treated as if it were a perfect indicative (a historic tense), and so is followed by an imperfect subjunctive in the subordinate clause:

 (Cicero)
'but how it happened that you suspected this from my earlier letters, I don't know'

The imperative mood
The imperative mood has two tenses, present and future.

Present imperative

Positive commands
The present imperative mood is the normal tense used for giving direct orders which the speaker wishes to be carried out at once. The active form can be made plural by adding -te:
 (Catullus)
'give me a thousand kisses, then a hundred!'

 (Livy)
'give me your right hands and your oath!'

Deponent verbs such as  'I set out' or  'I follow' have an imperative ending in -re or -minī (plural):
 (Cicero)
'the gates are open: depart!'

 (Terence)
'follow me this way inside, both of you'

Negative commands
An imperative is usually made negative by using  (literally, 'be unwilling!') plus the infinitive:
 (Seneca the Elder)
'don't be surprised'

However, in poetry an imperative can sometimes be made negative with the particle nē:
 (Virgil)
'do not terrify me, who am already scared, obscene birds!'

A negative order can also use the perfect subjunctive: 
 (Cicero)
'do not be afraid on my account'

In later Latin,  plus the present subjunctive became more common, for example in the Vulgate Bible. In the following example the first three verbs use the present subjunctive, and the third the perfect subjunctive:
 (Mark, 10.19)
'do not commit adultery, do not kill, do not steal, do not speak false testimony'

Future imperative
Latin also has a Future imperative or 2nd imperative, ending in -tō(te), used to request someone to do something at a future time, or if something else happens first. This imperative is very common in early writers such as Plautus and Cato, but it is also found in later writers such as Cicero and Martial:

 (Plautus)
'ask tomorrow; it will be given to you'

 (Terence)
'when we have finished washing, get washed if you wish'

 (Cato)
'if you are (going to be) eating it (cabbage) raw, dip it in vinegar'

 (Cicero)
'if anything happens, write to me'

 (Martial)
'Sextillus, laugh a lot at anyone who calls you a 'faggot' and show them the middle finger'

Some verbs have only the second imperative, for example  'know',  'remember'. In this case the imperative sometimes has a present rather than future meaning:

 (Cicero)
'know that I have been blessed with a little son, and that Terentia is safe'

 (Cicero)
'when you're in Britain, take care ... and always remember this...'

There is also a future passive imperative, but it is extremely rare. It can be is either 2nd or 3rd person:

 (Ausonius)
'A spouse should be joined equal to equal' (or: 'Be joined as a spouse equal to an equal')

3rd person formal imperative
Related to the colloquial future imperative is the formal imperative (usually used in the 3rd person) of legal language, as in this invented law from Cicero's :

 (Cicero)
'there shall be two men with royal power; and from consulting they are to be called 'consuls'; they are to obey nobody; for them the welfare of the people shall be the supreme law'

According to J.G.F. Powell,  is not a genuine archaic form; in early Latin  is used only in deponent verbs and is 2nd or 3rd person singular.

Infinitive tenses
Formation

There are two main infinitive tenses, present and perfect (e.g.  'to lead' and  'to have led'). However, a number of further infinitives are made periphrastically to represent other shades of meaning, such as future and potential, in indirect speech.

1st conjugation: 
2nd conjugation: 
3rd conjugation (-ō): 
3rd conjugation (-iō): 
4th conjugation: 

Irregular verbs:
 'I give': 
 'I bear': 
 'I go': 
 'I want': 
 'I don't want': 
 'I prefer': 
 'I am': 
 'I am able': 
 'I become / am made': 

Passive and deponent verbs:
1st conjugation: 
2nd conjugation: 
3rd conjugation (-ō):  (no -r-)
3rd conjugation (-iō): 
4th conjugation: 

Examples of deponent verbs are  'to encourage',  'to promise',  'to follow',  'to come out',  'to lie (tell a lie)'

In early Latin (especially Plautus), the passive and deponent infinitive often ends in -ier:  'to be scolded',  'to be seen',  'to obtain',  'to wake up' etc.

An archaic form of the perfect active infinitive, ending in -se is sometimes found in early Latin. There are also some rare archaic future infinitives ending in -ssere, e.g.  and others.

Compound infinitives 
The compound infinitives are usually found in the accusative case, as in most of the examples below. Occasionally, however, they are found in the nominative, for example with  'he is said' or  'he seems':

 (Cicero)
'he is said to be planning to come'

The participle can also change to show gender and plurality, as in the following where  is feminine plural:

 (Cicero)
'it is agreed that an ambush was made'

However, the passive future infinitive is made using the supine of the verb. The -um therefore stays constant and does not change for gender or number.

The future infinitive is used only for indirect statements.

Omission of  
Often the  part of a compound infinitive is omitted when combined with a participle or gerundive:

 (Seneca)
'he heard that his brother had been killed'

 (Caesar)
'Pompey reckoned that it was necessary for him to attempt to attempt something'

 (Cicero)
'I am sure that I will come to the city soon'

Historic infinitive
The present infinitive is occasionally used in narrative as a tense in its own right. It usually describes a scene in which the same action was being done repeatedly. There are often two or more historic infinitives in succession. When the subject is expressed, it is in the nominative case (distinguishing the historic infinitive from the accusative and infinitive of reported speech).

 (Sallust)
'then there was a ghastly spectacle on the open plains: people kept chasing, fleeing, being killed, being captured'

 (Cicero)
'the poor man kept shouting, as he was being dragged away, that he had done nothing'

 (Cicero)
'he by turns kept begging them, then threatening, now offering hope, now fear'

'Could have done'
The perfect tense  with the infinitive can often mean 'I was able to' or 'I managed to':

 (Cicero)
'Scipio managed to make Publius Rupilius Consul, but he wasn't able to do the same for Rupilius's brother Lucius'

However, it can also mean 'I could have done (but did not)':
 (Cicero)
'what I was and what I could have been, I can now no longer be'

 (Juvenal)
'(Cicero) could have despised Antony's swords (i.e. would have had no reason to fear them), if he had spoken everything in this way!'

 (Cicero)
'you ask what more Plancius could have achieved, if he had been the son of Gnaeus Scipio'

The pluperfect subjunctive after  also means 'could have':

 (Livy)
'although he could have led them out into battle, Aemilius held his troops inside the wall of the camp'

'Ought to have done'
'Ought to have done' is often expressed with a past tense of  'I have a duty to' or  'it is fitting' together with a present infinitive:
 (Cicero)
'you ought not to have come to the Senate on that day'

 (Cicero)
'you ought to have been put to death long ago by order of the Consul, Catiline!'

Sometimes,  means 'it must be the case that...':

 (Cicero)
'if there was a lot of dust on his shoes, he must have been coming from a journey'

Sometimes, in familiar style,  can be used with the perfect infinitive passive:
 (Cicero)
'this ought to have been done long ago'

The indirect speech form is regularly  with the present infinitive:
 (Cicero)
'they say I ought not to have built the house'

Indirect commands with the infinitive

Indirect commands are made with two constructions: either  (or ) with the present or imperfect subjunctive, or the accusative and infinitive construction, using the present infinitive. The latter construction is used especially when the main verb is  'I order' or  'I forbid', but also sometimes after  'I command':

 (Caesar)
'he ordered the signal to be given'

 (Cicero)
'what tyrant has ever forbidden unhappy people to mourn?'

Indirect statements

The infinitive is very commonly used for the reported verb in indirect statements. Except with passive sentences using  'he is said' or  'he seems' and the like, the subject of the quoted sentence is usually put into the accusative case and the construction is known as an 'accusative and infinitive'.

The rule of tense is that the present infinitive is used for any action or situation which is contemporary with the main verb, the perfect for actions or situations anterior to the main verb, and the future infinitive for actions or situations later than the main verb. An exception to this rule is the verb  'I remember', which when used of personal reminiscence (e.g. 'I remember being present') is usually followed by a present infinitive.

Present infinitive
The present infinitive is used to express an action or situation simultaneous with the verb of speaking:
 (Cicero)
'Solon pretended that he was mad'

 (Livy)
'Brutus noticed that an attack was being made on him'

The present infinitive used after  when describing a personal reminiscence, however, refers to the past:
 (Seneca the Elder)
'I remember going into his school when he was just about to recite a speech against Milo'

Perfect infinitive
In indirect statements, a perfect infinitive represents an event or a situation which occurred prior to the time of the verb of speaking. The first two examples have a verb of speaking in the present tense:

 (Cicero)
'you say that your bodyguard was killed'

 (Cicero)
'he is said to have written these books at that time'

In the following the main verb is in a past tense, so that in English the pluperfect is used when translating the infinitive:

 ([Caesar])
'they learnt that Caesar had come'

 (Servius to Cicero)
he reported to me that Marcus Marcellus had been stabbed with a dagger and had received two wounds'

The infinitive  can describe a situation in the past, earlier than the time of the verb of speaking:

 (Livy)
'they say that his father was a butcher'

The perfect infinitive may also at times be translated with a continuous tense in English, representing an imperfect tense in the original speech:

 (Nepos)
'it is said that at that time the mother of Pausanias was still living'

Often the verb of speaking is omitted if it can be understood from the context:

 (Livy)
'a terrible thing had happened' (she said)

Archaic perfect infinitives such as  'to have said',  'to have looked down',  'to have understood' and others are found in Plautus: These in classical Latin would be  and : 

 (Plautus)
'are you saying, Milphio, that Syncerastus told you that both those girls were free-born?'

 (Plautus)
'I confess I did look down at you through the hole in your roof'

Perfect infinitive with 
The meaning of the two forms is different. The perfect infinitive with  merely refers to an event which took place before the time of the verb of speaking (e.g. ('he reported that Marcellus had been killed'). Thus there are two times involved, the time of the verb of speaking and the time of the event referred to. But when the perfect infinitive has  there are three times involved: the time of the verb of the speaking, the reference time, and a time earlier still when the event took place.

Just as a perfect tense can describe a current situation (e.g. 'he has died' = 'he is dead'), so a double perfect infinitive often describes a situation that existed at the time referred to, as in the following examples:

 (Asconius)
'it appears from the speech that while the trial was in progress, an army had been stationed in the forum by Gnaeus Pompeius'

 (Plautus)
'are you saying that (at the time when you saw me) I was wearing (lit. was dressed in) a lady's mantle?'

 (Hyginus)
'Hercules eventually came to Prometheus, who, as we said above, had (earlier) been chained up / was at that time chained up in the Caucasus mountain'

 (Cicero)
'finally a man who, it was established, had been stationed there to kill Gnaeus Pompeius was arrested with a weapon near the Senate'

 (Cicero)
'it is sufficient to show that (at the time he was killed) for Clodius great hope had been placed in Milo's death'

In other examples, the double perfect infinitive describes a situation which existed earlier on, but which later changed:

 (Cicero)
'I found out that (until you got to know him better) he had previously been unfairly suspected by you'

 (Ovid)
'Zancle (= Messina in Sicily) too is said to have been formerly joined to Italy, until the sea took away the common boundary'

 (Livy)
'Tanaquil addressed the people: she said that the king had (earlier) been knocked unconscious by the sudden blow, but he had now recovered'

 (Cicero)
'and (they are saying) that (the statue) had originally been placed there and dedicated in the name of that general (but later Gaius Verres removed it)'

It is also possible to find this infinitive in contexts not in indirect speech. In the following example the infinitive refers to an action which took place at an earlier period before the time of the imagined harvest, which is itself in the past:

 (Quintilian)
'it's possible for a place to have been sown (earlier) where (later) there was no harvest'

The distinction between the two types of perfect infinitive is available only in passive verbs. When the verb is active, the simple perfect infinitive is used in a similar context:

 (Quintilian)
'it is possible for a woman who did not give birth to have (earlier) slept with a man'

Another example not in direct speech the following, in which Martial is describing a magnificent he-goat depicted on a cup, and suggests that Phrixus's sister Helle might have preferred to have been riding on this rather than the ram which she fell off:

 (Martial)
'his sister might well have preferred to have been carried by this (before she died)'

There appear to be no examples of a deponent verb in this tense of the infinitive in classical Latin.

Future infinitive
The active future infinitive is formed periphrastically, using the future participle, for example  'to be going to lead'. The participle often occurs in the accusative case and can change for gender and number , etc).

The future infinitive is used in reported speech for events or situations which are to take place later than the verb of speaking:
 (Cicero)
'I am sure that you will do everything'

 (Plautus)
'promise that this will be (so)'

In a past context the future infinitive is translated with 'would' instead of 'will':

 (Plautus)
'I believed it would be annoying for you'

As with the perfect passive infinitive,  is often omitted:
 (Nepos)
'they would easily find the place where he was (he said)'

The irregular verbs  'I am able' and  'I want' have no future infinitive. In these verbs the present infinitive is used instead:

 (Caesar)
'they hope that they will be able to gain control of the whole of Gaul'

This is comparatively rare. The ending  does not change for gender or number:

 (Terence)
'a rumour came that a gladiator show was going to be given'

Another way of expressing the future in indirect statement is to use the phrase  'it would be the case that'. This can be used with an active or passive verb, and almost always with either the present or the imperfect subjunctive:

 (Cicero)
'I hope that we shall have that good fortune'

 (Tacitus)
'the astrologers replied that (Nero) would become Emperor, but that he would kill his mother'

 (Cicero)
'they all thought that the poor man was going to be beaten with rods'

 (Cicero)
'(the voice predicted) that unless precautions were taken, Rome would be captured'

Certain archaic future infinitives ending in -āssere can be found in Plautus, for example:

 (Plautus)
'if on the other hand they were otherwise minded and would not give what he wanted, he would attack their town with the greatest force and army'

 (Plautus)
'I believe you will have your request granted easily'

Future perfect infinitive
To express a future perfect tense in indirect statement is possible only if the verb is passive or deponent. In the following examples, a perfect participle is combined with the future infinitive :

 (Livy)
'the Carthaginians thought that the war was soon going to have been brought to an end'

 (Cicero)
'if someone were to remove fear, all carefulness of life would have been removed too'

 (Cicero)
'I can say this, that I will have achieved enough, if no danger redounds on me'

Very rarely  can be followed by a perfect or pluperfect subjunctive. In the following example, the pluperfect subjunctive represents a future perfect indicative of direct speech:

 (Cicero to Plancus)
'I hope (epistolary imperfect) that by the time you receive this letter, what I requested from you in my earlier letter will have been granted'

Periphrastic perfect infinitive

It is used in indirect speech for representing the main verb of an unreal conditional, whether referring to a past time or present time. In the following examples the verb refers to past time, and in the original sentence would have been pluperfect subjunctive:

 (Livy)
'but take this message to him, that I would have died better if I had not married on the day of my funeral!'

 (Cicero)
'he said that if I had not been consul, the republic would have been completely finished'

If the introductory verb is passive, such as  'he seems', the participle is nominative:

 (Quintilian)
'it is unlikely that he would have told a lie unless he had been desperate'

The same tense of the infinitive can also represent the transformation into indirect statement of an imperfect potential subjunctive, referring to a hypothetical present situation:

 (Cicero)
'do you think any old woman would ever be so crazy as to believe in dreams if they didn't come true by chance sometimes?'

 (Pliny)
'what do we think would be happening to him if he were alive?' – 'he would be dining with us!'

 (Cicero)
'they confess that they would not lift a finger for the sake of virtue, unless virtue itself gave pleasure'

In such sentences the imperfect subjunctive in the subordinate clause (in this case ) is left unchanged, despite the fact that the main verb is primary.

 (Caesar)
'if at that very moment certain reports had not arrived bringing news of Caesar's victory, most people reckoned that (the town) would have been lost'

However this is very rare, and in fact only two instances have been noted (the other being Cicero, Tusc. 3.69).

Gerundive infinitives

 (Cicero)
'I think something should be given to the doctor himself'

The ending of the gerundive varies according to gender and number. In the following it is feminine singular:

 (Gellius)
'he says that in the name "Valerius" in the vocative case, the first syllable should be accented'

The order of the words can be reversed:

 (Cicero)
'I do not think there is any need to doubt'

The perfect gerundive infinitive with  indicates something that was necessary at a previous time:

 (Cicero)
'I imagine that it was unavoidable for you to undertake that journey to Asia'

However, it can also refer to what ought to have been done at some time in the past:

 (Livy)
'what, pray, ought a praetor to have done?'

In a conditional clause in reported speech the perfect gerundive infinitive can also refer to something that would have been necessary in some hypothetical situation:

 (Tacitus)
'and (he said that) there wouldn't be anyone who would have to die sooner than himself if Silius were Emperor'

It is used in indirect statements to describe something which it is going to be necessary to do:

 (Curtius)
'and so he had ordered his men to lay out their camp in that very place, delighted that it was going to be necessary to fight the decisive battle in that particular narrow plain' (see Battle of Issus)

It can also describe what must inevitably happen at a future time:

 (Curtius)
'(he had written that) a person would inevitably grow old just visiting such a huge country, even without fighting a battle'

Participles
Compared to Greek, Latin is deficient in participles, having only three, as follows, as well as the gerundive. The Romans themselves considered the gerundive also to be a participle, but most modern grammars treat it as a separate part of speech.

The different participles of the verb  are shown below:

The participles are all verbal adjectives, and so the ending changes according to case, gender, and number.

As the table shows, there is no passive present or future participle, and no active past participle. In deponent verbs, however, the Perfect participle is active in meaning, e.g. , 'having set out',  'having tried'. In deponent verbs, the gerundive is usually used in impersonal form and with an active meaning:  'it is necessary to set out',  'it is necessary to die',  'it is necessary to try'; but some deponent verbs have a personal gerundive with a passive sense:  'needing to be encouraged',  'needing to be followed':
 (Columella)
'a middle course must be followed'

The present and future participles of deponent verbs are active in form, e.g.  'dying',  'about to die'. Originally deponent verbs had no present participle and perfect participles such as  'thinking' and  'fearing' were used with a present meaning.

The verb  'I am' has no Present or Perfect participle in classical Latin, but only the Future participle  'going to be'.

The verbs  'I want' and  'I am able' have no future participle.

Such endings are sometimes found even in classical Latin. Later, -endus became usual, but in the verb  'I go', the gerundive is always  'necessary to go'.

Like the infinitive, the tenses of the participles are not absolute but relative to the main verb of the sentence. For example, a future participle can refer to an action in the past, provided it is later than the time of the main verb; and similarly the perfect participle can refer to an action in the future, provided it is earlier than the time of the main verb.

Present participle
The present participle usually describes a condition or an action which is happening at the time of the main verb:
 (Cicero)
'he was doused with boiling water'

 (Livy)
'having drawn his sword, he came to Lucretia while she was sleeping'

Occasionally, a present participle can refer to an action which takes place immediately before the time of the main verb:
 (Livy)
'and to her husband, when he asked "are you all right?" she replied "not at all!" '

Present participles of deponent verbs are only very rarely found in early Latin (although Plautus is said to have written a play called  'Those dying together') but they became common later.

Perfect participle
The perfect participle refers to an action which took place before the time of the main verb, or to the state that something is in as a result of an earlier action:
 (Eutropius)
'he buried the dead (those who had been killed)'

A deponent participle such as  'thinking, reckoning' or  'fearing' can often be translated as if it were present:

 (Nepos)
'thinking this a suitable time for pursuing his studies, he went to Athens'

Future participle
The future participle is most commonly used in the periphrastic tenses or in indirect statements (see examples above). 'An examination of the usage of the various authors shows that the form in -ūrus did not reach the full status of a participle till the time of Livy. Up to the time of Caesar and Cicero its use was almost restricted to a combination with the verb , making a periphrastic future tense (Woodcock). Woodcock speculates that the -ūrus ending might originally have been a verbal noun. 

In later authors the future participle is sometimes used as in Greek to indicate purpose:

 (Pliny)
'he launched some warships, with a view to bringing help'

Bibliography
Aerts, Simon (2018). "Tense, Aspect and Aktionsart in Classical Latin: Towards a New Approach". Symbolae Osloenses 92(1):107–149.
Andrewes, M. (1937). "Caesar's Use of Tense Sequence in Indirect Speech". The Classical Review, Vol. 51, No. 4 (Sep., 1937), pp. 114–116.
Andrewes, M. (1951). "The Function of Tense Variation in the Subjunctive Mood of Oratio Obliqua". The Classical Review, New Series, Vol. 1, No. 3/4 (Dec., 1951), pp. 142–146.
De Melo, Wolfgang (2007). "Latin prohibitions and the Origins of the u/w-Perfect and the Type amāstī". Glotta, Bd. 83 (2007), pp. 43–68.
De Melo, Wolfgang (2012). "Kuryłowicz's first 'law of analogy' and the development of passive periphrases in Latin". In Philomen Probert & Andreas Willi, Laws and Rules in Indo-European. Oxford, chapter 6, pp. 83–101.
Ernout, Alfred; Thomas, François (1953). Syntaxe Latine (2nd edition). Paris, Klincksieck.
Gildersleeve, B. L. & Gonzalez Lodge (1895). Gildersleeve's Latin Grammar. 3rd Edition. (Macmillan)
Goodrich, W. J. "On the Prospective Use of the Latin Imperfect Subjunctive in Relative Clauses". The Classical Review, Vol. 31, No. 3/4 (May - Jun., 1917), pp. 83–86.
Greenough, J. B. et al. (1903). Allen and Greenough's New Latin Grammar for Schools and Colleges. Boston and London.
Haverling, Gerd V.M. (2002). "On the semantic functions of the Latin perfect". Amsterdam Studies in Classical Philology, Volume 10.
Haverling, Gerd V.M. (2012). "Actionality, tense, and viewpoint". In Baldi, Philip; Cuzzolin, Pierluigi (eds.) (2012). Constituent Syntax: Adverbial Phrases, Adverbs, Mood, Tense. , pp. 277–524.
Kennedy, Benjamin Hall (1871). The Revised Latin Primer. Edited and further revised by Sir James Mountford, Longman 1930; reprinted 1962.
Ker, James (2007). "Roman Repraesentatio". The American Journal of Philology, Vol. 128, No. 3 (Autumn, 2007), pp. 341–365.
Madvig, J. N. (1842). . In , vol. 2. pp. 218–226.
Pinkster, Harm (1987). "The Strategy and Chronology of the Development of Future and Perfect Tense Auxiliaries in Latin". In Martin Harris and Paolo Ramat (eds.) Historical Development of Auxiliaries (Trends in Linguistics. Studies and Monographs, 35). De Gruyter Mouton.
Pinkster, Harm (1990), Latin Syntax and Semantics. Chapter 11: The Latin tense system.
Postgate, J. P. (1905). "Repraesentatio Temporum in the Oratio Obliqua of Caesar". The Classical Review, Vol. 19, No. 9 (Dec., 1905), pp. 441–446.
Powell, J. G. F. (2005). "Cicero's adaptation of legal Latin in the de Legibus". In Reinhardt, T. et al. (eds). Aspects of the Language of Latin Prose. 
Salmon, E. T. (1931). "A Note on Subordinate Clauses in Oratio Obliqua". The Classical Review, Vol. 45, No. 5 (Nov., 1931), p. 173.
Terrell, Glanville (1904). "The Apodosis of the Unreal Condition in Oratio Obliqua in Latin". The American Journal of Philology, Vol. 25, No. 1 (1904), pp. 59–73.
Schlicher, J. J. (1931). "The Historical Tenses and Their Functions in Latin". Classical Philology Vol. 26, No. 1 (Jan., 1931), pp. 46–59.
Viti, Carlotta (2010). "The non-literal use of tenses in Latin, with particular reference to the praesens historicum". Revue de linguistique latine du Centre Alfred Ernout. (Posted at Zurich Open Repository and Archive, University of Zurich).
Wheeler, Arthur Leslie, (1903). "The Imperfect Indicative in Early Latin". The American Journal of Philology, Vol. 24, No. 2 (1903), pp. 163–191.
Wigtil, David N. (1992) "Translating Latin Tenses into English". The Classical World, Vol. 85, No. 6 (Jul. - Aug., 1992), pp. 675–686.
Woodcock, E.C. (1959), A New Latin Syntax.

References

External links
University of Chicago Perseus under PhiloLogic searchable corpus. Perseus under PhiloLogic home page
Online version of Allen & Greenough's Latin Grammar
Online version of Gildersleeve & Lodge's Latin Grammar

Latin grammar
Indo-European verbs